Devar  is a 1966 Hindi film directed by Mohan Sehgal. It stars Dharmendra, Sharmila Tagore, Deven Verma and Shashikala. The music is by Roshan and the lyrics by Anand Bakshi; this is their only film together that met with success.

The film is based on the short novel Naa by the noted Bengali writer Tara Shankar Bandopadhyay. This novel was already adapted into a 1954 Bengali movie of the same name, and the 1962 Tamil movie Padithaal Mattum Podhuma. This movie is considered Mohan Sehgal's masterpiece, and was praised for Dharmendra & Sharmila's cool performances, and Deven Verma's commendable negative role. All of the songs from Devar were big hits at the time, and are still very popular, especially  "Baharon ne mera chaman lootkar" and "Aaya hai mujhe phir yaad" by Mukesh, and "Duniya mein aisa kahan" by Lata Mangeshkar.

Plot

Shankar and Bhawariya are childhood lovers who have been parted by unfortunate circumstances. Shankar's cousin Suresh is an advocate. Matchmaker Ram comes up with marriage proposals for both the cousins. Following family traditions, it is decided that the boys will meet the respective brides by proxy. Suresh falls in love with Madhumati. He cooks up a wicked plot. He writes two letters to each of the families due to which an innocent and somewhat less educated Shankar is badly treated by his parents. One day accidentally Shankar learns that Madhumati is Bhawariya, the girl whom he used to love. So also, Bhawariya's brother, a handwriting expert learns of Suresh's wicked plan. Bhawariya's brother asks Suresh to accept his guilt before Ashok's parents presuming that it is Suresh sitting on chair, but it happens to be Ashok who listens this and learns of everything. In a rift between Shankar and Suresh, Suresh dies accidentally, for which Shankar is held the culprit. Madumati who is determined to see her husband's murderer hanged, changes her words and saves Shankar.

The movie ends without Madumati ever knowing that Shankar is her childhood lover.

Reception
The Essential Guide to Bollywood (2005) says that the film "contained deep elements of Bengali literature... The film is remarkable for projecting the ironic twists of fate in an unconventional format with the lead pair bound to the 'wrong' spouses till the very end."

In 2014, The Friday Times noted that this film was "probably the only role that [comedian Deven] Verma played that had shades of grey... He may have played a villain but many left the theatre wondering how such a good looking, suave man could have such a complex character."

Cast
 Dharmendra as Shankar
 Sharmila Tagore as Bhawariya/Madhumati
 Shashikala as Shanta	
 Deven Verma as Suresh	
 Lalita Kumari as Basanti
 Durga Khote as Madhumati's mother
 Dhumal as Ram Bharose
 Sulochana Latkar as Shakuntala	
Sabita Chatterjee as Lily
Raj Mehra as  Thakur Mahendra Singh
 Tarun Bose as Advocate Gopinath
 D. K. Sapru as Diwan Jaswant Rai (as Sapru)
Mumtaz Begum as Shankar's mother
Bela Bose as dancer in 'roothe saiyan' song
Brahm Bhardwaj as Public Prosecutor
Nazir Kashmiri as judge
Pardeep Singh

Soundtrack

References

External links
 

1966 films
1960s Hindi-language films